Von Wayne Charles (born 26 July 1972), better known by his stage name Wayne Wonder, is a Jamaican reggae artist. While his early recordings were dancehall and reggae, he later moved towards hip hop and rap. His most popular single is the 2003 hit "No Letting Go".

Biography

Early life
Wonder was born in Buff Bay, Portland, Jamaica. He sang in Sunday school as a child, Wayne attended Camperdown High School in  eastern Kingston, and began songwriting at the age of 13, getting a major career break when he was given a regular weekly slot at Metro Media in Allman Town.

Auditioning and debut album
He auditioned at Sonic Sounds studio, but while Sly Dunbar was impressed, his touring commitments with Black Uhuru prevented him from signing Wonder. He had more success, however, with King Tubby, who produced his first single, "Long and Lasting Love", in 1985, with two more following. Wonder's career suffered a setback when Tubby was killed in 1988, and he recorded for several other record producers at Sonic Sound, enjoying a further hit with the Lloyd Dennis–produced "It's Over Now", leading to the release of his first album, One More Chance, although his success in this era was limited.

Second album: Part 2 and further releases
His fortunes improved when he began working with Dave Kelly, a friend from primary school, who had become resident sound engineer at Penthouse Studios. The partnership enjoyed a string of hits, starting with  "Saddest Day", and they also worked on Wonder's second album, Part 2. His 1990 live performance of Alphaville's "Forever Young" was recorded and later released to Alphaville fans in a limited, cassette-only album entitled History. He toured the UK in 1992 along with other Penthouse stars Marcia Griffiths, Tony Rebel, and Buju Banton. He also recorded "Bonafide Love (Movie Star)" with Buju Banton, and wrote several early hits for him, including the controversial "Boom Bye Bye". He toured again with Banton in 1994 as part of the Penthouse Showcase. Wonder formed the band Alias along with Kelly, Baby Cham, Frisco Kid, and Frankie Sly, and later Entourage.

Record label launch and further album releases
In 2000, Wonder launched his own record label, Singso, and his 2000 album Da Vibe saw him begin to incorporate hip hop into his sound. He collaborated with several other major artists, including Jason Dalyrimple of Soul for Real, Foxy Brown, and Lisa "Left Eye" Lopes, and the move towards hip hop increased with his 2001 album Schizophrenic.

Atlantic Records signing and international recognition
His career really took off internationally when he signed to Atlantic Records, achieving worldwide success with the song "No Letting Go" in 2003.  The song is based on the Diwali riddim, which was also used by several other artists that year, such as Sean Paul, Lumidee and Missy Elliott. The single reached No. 11 in the US and No. 3 in the UK.

"No Letting Go" and the album No Holding Back were a major success on urban radio stations in the US, and this prompted the release of several compilation albums featuring older Wonder material, including Trojan Records' Inna Bashment Style: The Roots Of An Urban Warrior (2005).

Further releases
A new album, Foreva, was released in 2007. It reached No. 6 on the US Top Reggae Albums chart.

His album My Way was released in December 2012. In October 2014, he featured on the Never Mind the Buzzcocks identity parade.

Discography

Albums

Compilations albums

Singles

References

External links

Wayne Wonder on Instagram

1972 births
Living people
Reggae fusion artists
People from Portland Parish
Jamaican male singers
Jamaican songwriters
Jamaican reggae singers
Jamaican hip hop musicians
Jamaican dancehall musicians
Trojan Records artists
VP Records artists